Robert Jan D'Eith (born September 24, 1964) is a Canadian politician, who was elected to the Legislative Assembly of British Columbia in the 2017 provincial election. He represents the electoral district of Maple Ridge-Mission as a member of the British Columbia New Democratic Party caucus. D'Eith is also a pianist, author and part-time music lawyer.

Personal life 

D'Eith was born September 24, 1964 in British Hong Kong. He immigrated with his father John D'Eathe and mother Vanessa Tancock (née Stelle-Perkins) to Canada in 1968 and was naturalized as a Canadian citizen in 1972. He has three siblings. D'Eith grew up in West Vancouver, British Columbia and attended West Bay Elementary, Cypress Park Elementary, Pauline Johnson Elementary, Irwin Park Elementary, Hillside Secondary, and Carson Graham Secondary graduating in 1982. After high school, he attended the University of Victoria earning degrees in History (B.A. Hons 1986) and in Law (J.D. 1989).

D'Eith was married to Nicolette Maxwell (née Langezaal) for 11 years and had three sons with her. He married Kim D'Eith (née Kosaba) on July 31, 2010 (at the Kosaba Lake House, Stump Lake BC) and has two step-daughters.

Career 

After articling at Swinton & Company and being called to the bar in 1990, D'Eith worked as in-house counsel for his father at Freehold Developments. He was project manager, building a strip mall in Calgary as part of Douglasdale Estates. After the real estate project, he started his own private practice primarily in real estate and entertainment law. At the same time, D'Eith was pursuing a career in music. In the late 1990s, he worked briefly for Sanguinetti, Braidwood Law in Squamish BC and then as counsel at Bardel Animation. In 2001, D'Eith became the executive director of the British Columbia music association Music BC. and restricted his practice to part-time. He now practices solely as a music lawyer. He also began a label and consulting company Adagio Music. As executive director, Bob has grown Music BC to a dominant force for the music industry in BC. D'Eith was the chair of the 2009 Vancouver JUNO Awards host committee and developed the very successful $5.2 million Peak Performance Project with the Pattison Broadcast Group.

On May 1, 2013, he published his first eBook entitled, A Career in Music: the other 12 step program. The book is focused on developing indie artists and new professionals in music. On Feb 14, 2014, D'Eith published his first novel The Displaced.

Music career 

D'Eith trained as a classical and jazz pianist while growing up. He played in a number of semi-professional bands until finishing law school. Once he returned to Vancouver, he joined a band called The Watchmen with lead singer Jimmy Gilmore (subsequently a member of the Silencers in Scotland) and Rob Lulic (guitar). After Jimmy left for Scotland, D'Eith, Alex Dias and Rob Lulic continued to build on the band and this core eventually became Rymes with Orange; singers Lyndon Johnson and Nelson Sinclair joined the band. The band recorded its first album Peel (1992 mixed by Bill Buckingham) and had a number of successful radio and MuchMusic videos. After touring Canada a number of times, D'Eith was forced to choose between a career on the road or a life on the business side of music. He moved back to co-managing the band with Peter Karroll and became a non-touring member of the band. The band added Steve Hennessy and Niko Quintal and recorded their second album Trapped in a Machine (1994 - produced by John Webster and recorded at Turtle Recording in Richmond, BC). This record resulted in a number of Top 30 radio hits including "Toy Train" which was undoubtedly the band's biggest hit. The song was featured in the Labatt's commercial Genuine Kelly. During this period, D'Eith was honoured with a Best keyboardist nomination at Canadian Music Week and the band was nominated for a Juno Award for Best New Artist.

After a split from Rymes with Orange, D'Eith decided to re-focus his music creation. After years of urging from his father, he teamed up with his brother Paul's best friend from school Paul Schmidt. Schmidt is a classically trained guitar player. The idea was to create music which was not meant for commercial radio. It was originally an attempt to write music which would be suitable for film and television and showcase D'Eith and Schmidt's composing ability. The project took on a life of its own and the group Mythos was born. The first release was an EP called Introspection (1995). The music can be described as ambient, instrumental music featuring beats, piano, guitar, vocalese, and various other organic and synthetic elements. It is a mixture of world, electronic, dance, classical, and jazz. Generally Mythos does not use lyrics. The remix of the piece "November" became commercially successful on radio. This led to an increase CD sales and eventually awards with a Western Canadian Music Awards (WCMA) (best dance) and a Juno Award nomination (best instrumental). Canadian success and a trip to MIDEM in France led to a deal with Bay Area indie label XDOT25 which released the EP in the USA. Mehdi Amadi from XDOT 25 was working on a deal with Higher Octave, a Malibu California New Age label that agreed to pick up Mythos. Higher Octave then released a combination of Introspection and a follow up unreleased EP Iridescence (1996) with the world release of Mythos (1998) through Virgin/EMI. Mythos became a big seller for Higher Octave who went on to release the follow-up albums Reality of a Dreamer (2000) and Eternity (2002). Sales would surpass 100,000 and Mythos stayed on the Billboard New Age charts for many months. The album's artwork was licensed from Gil Bruvel. Mythos subsequently released the album Purity (2006) with Pacific Music/Warner in Canada and Allegro/Alula records in the USA. Since that time, the pair Paul have continued to write, but with Schmidt living in Korea, recording has been a challenge.

After a six-year hiatus, Mythos released a new Album entitled Journey in April 2013.

Electoral record

See also 
Mythos (musical project)

References 

1964 births
Living people
Hong Kong emigrants to Canada
British Columbia candidates for Member of Parliament
British Columbia New Democratic Party MLAs
Canadian classical pianists
Intellectual property lawyers
Lawyers in British Columbia
Musicians from British Columbia
New Democratic Party candidates for the Canadian House of Commons
People from Maple Ridge, British Columbia
University of Victoria alumni
University of Victoria Faculty of Law alumni
21st-century Canadian male musicians
21st-century Canadian politicians
Canadian jazz pianists
Canadian rock pianists
21st-century Canadian pianists